Sureshjan (also Romanized as Sūreshjān, Sooreshjan, and Sowreshjān; also known as Shareshkan, Shirishgūn, Sorūshgān, and Sorūshjān) is a village in Barf Anbar Rural District, in the Central District of Fereydunshahr County, Isfahan Province, Iran. At the 2006 census, its population was 691, in 171 families.

See also
 Peria
 Shurishkan Gospel

References 

Populated places in Fereydunshahr County